Donald Duff may refer to:

 Donald Duff (surgeon) (1893–1968), Scottish surgeon and mountain rescue pioneer
 Donald Duff (geologist) (1927–1998), Scottish geologist and academic author